Juan García Ponce (September 22, 1932 – December 27, 2003) was a Mexican novelist, short-story writer, essayist, translator and critic of Mexican art.

Life and works

He was born in Mérida, state of Yucatán, Mexico. Notable works include La aparición de lo invisible (1968) and Las huellas de la voz (1982). In his novels Figura de paja (1964), La casa en la playa (1966), La presencia lejana (1968), La cabaña (1969), La invitación (1972), El nombre olvidado (1970), El libro (1978), Crónica de la intervención (1982), Inmaculada o los placeres de la Inocencia (1989) he intertwines the erotic with philosophic rigor and the aesthetic, illuminating the secret, demonic side of reality, accepting all of its risks.

He formed an important part of the Generación de Medio Siglo, or the Generación de la Ruptura, along with writers such as José de la Colina, Salvador Elizondo, Inés Arredondo, Sergio Pitol and Elena Poniatowska, and artists and painters such as Manuel Felguerez, Vicente Rojo Almazán, José Luis Cuevas, Roger von Gunten, and Fernando Garcia Ponce.

He received various prestigious prizes including the Premio Teatral Ciudad de México (1956), the Xavier Villaurrutia Award (1972) for his novel Encuentros, the Elías Sourasky Prize (1974), the Premio Anagrama de Ensayo (1981), the Premio de la Crítica (1985), the National Prize for Arts and Sciences in Linguistics and Literature (1989), the FIL Literary Award in Romance Languages (or Juan Rulfo Prize for Latin American and Caribbean Literature) (2001) and the Medalla Eligio Ancona.

In 2007 the journal Nexos asked various writers and literary critics to select the greatest Mexican novels of the last 30 years. Juan Garcia Ponce’s novel Crónica de la intervención came in third place.

Awards
 Xavier Villaurrutia Prize (1972)
  de Ensayo (1981)
 Juan Rulfo Prize (2001)

References

Bibliography
 Rodríguez-Hernández, Raúl: Mexico's Ruins: Juan García Ponce and the Writing of Modernity. State University of New York Press, 2007. 

1932 births
2003 deaths
Mexican male novelists
Mexican male short story writers
Mexican short story writers
Mexican essayists
Male essayists
Writers from Yucatán (state)
People from Mérida, Yucatán
20th-century Mexican novelists
20th-century short story writers
20th-century essayists
20th-century Mexican male writers